Mauidrillia incerta is an extinct species of sea snail, a marine gastropod mollusk in the family Horaiclavidae.

Description

Distribution
This extinct marine species is endemic to New Zealand

References

 Beu, A.G. 1970 Bathyal Upper Miocene Mollusca from Wairarapa District, New Zealand. Transactions of the Royal Society of New Zealand. Earth sciences, 7(12): 209–240
 Maxwell, P.A. (2009). Cenozoic Mollusca. pp 232–254 in Gordon, D.P. (ed.) New Zealand inventory of biodiversity. Volume one. Kingdom Animalia: Radiata, Lophotrochozoa, Deuterostomia. Canterbury University Press, Christchurch

External links
 National Paleontological Collection Database: Mauidrillia incerta

incerta
Gastropods described in 1970